The FM broadcasting in India began in 1977, but boomed after 2001 when the privatisation of FM broadcasting began. 
AIR's FM LRS ( Local Radio Station ) was inaugurated on 1 July 2000 at 06:00 hours in Kodaikanal relaying Madurai programs in the frequency 100.5 MHz. 100.5 was so much popular and LRS was upgraded to a FM Channel in just two months. The channel covered a radius of about 200km due to its location at 2200 meters above MSL at Kodaikanal. KODAI FM, as it is popularly known. It is the biggest individual FM channel in India in both area coverage and listenership.

As of December 2018, there are more than 369 operational private radio stations in more than 101 cities and towns across India. The Government of India-owned All India Radio has about 450 FM stations covering 39% of the area and 52% of the population of India.

History 
FM broadcasting began on 23 July 1977 in Chennai, then Madras, and was expanded during the 1990s, nearly 50 years after it mushroomed in the US. The country first experimented with private FM broadcasts in the small tourist destination of Goa and the large metropolitan areas of Delhi, Kolkata, Mumbai  and Chennai. These were followed by private stations in Bangalore, Hyderabad, Jaipur and Lucknow.

Until 1993, All India Radio, a government undertaking, was the only radio broadcaster in India. The government then decided to privatise the radio broadcasting sector. It sold airtime blocks on its FM channels in Indore, Hyderabad, Mumbai, Delhi, Kolkata, Vizag and Goa to private operators, who developed their own program content. The Times Group operated its brand, Times FM, till June 1998. After that, the government decided not to renew contracts given to private operators. Instead, in 2000, the government announced the auction of 108 FM frequencies across India, opening up the FM broadcasting industry to private competition.

Radio City Bangalore, started on July 3, 2001, is India's first private FM radio station. It launched with presenters such as Vera, Rohit Barker, Seetal Iyer, Jonzie Kurian, Geeta Modgil, Suresh Venkat, and Chaitanya Hegde and Priya Ganapathy on the weekends. The Times Group rebranded their radio operations, establishing the Radio Mirchi brand. The first Radio Mirchi station began broadcasting on October 4, 2001 in Indore.

Indian policy currently states that these broadcasters are assessed a one-time entry fee (OTEF), for a license period of 10 years. Under the Indian accounting system, this amount is amortised over the 10-year period at 10% per annum. The annual license fee for private broadcasters is either 4% of revenue share or 10% of reserve price, whichever is higher.

India's earlier attempts to privatise its FM channels ran into rough weather when private players bid heavily and most could not meet their commitments to pay the government the amounts they owed.

Content 
Nationally, many of the current FM broadcasters, including the Times of India, Hindustan Times, Mid-Day, and BBC are established media institutions in the country, and are making a strong pitch for news on FM, which is currently limited to nationalised stations only. Private FM stations are allowed to rebroadcast news from All India Radio, as long as they do so without any changes or additions. The Supreme Court of India on 17 October 2013 issued a public interest litigation to the central government requesting that the rules should be changed to allow FM stations to broadcast news reports.

Radio stations by location

National Capital Region

Kolkata, West Bengal

Radio SRFTI (90.4 MHz, Available within a 10 Km radius of the film institute)
Radio JU (90.8 MHz, Available within a 5 km radius of the University, from 11:00 AM to 7:30 PM)
Y FM NSHM (91.2 MHz, Available within a 10 km radius of the institute, from 9:00 AM to 6:00 PM)
Friends FM (91.9 MHz)
Big FM (92.7 MHz)
Red FM (93.5 MHz)
Radio One (94.3 MHz)
Radio Mirchi (98.3 MHz)(Bengali,Hindi)
AIR FM Gold (100.1 MHz)
AIR FM Vividh Bharati (101.8 MHz)
Fever 104 FM (104 MHz)
Ishq FM (104.8 MHz)
AIR FM Rainbow (107 MHz)

Kanpur, Uttar Pradesh 

IIT Kanpur Radio (90.4 MHz)
Waqt Ki Awaz (91.2 MHz)
Big FM (92.7 MHz)
Red FM (93.5 MHz)
Fever 104 FM (95.0 MHz)
Radio Mirchi (98.3 MHz)
AIR FM Rainbow (102.2 MHz)
Vividh Bharati (103.7 MHz)
Mirchi Love (91.9 MHz)
News Channel English (105.6 MHz)
Radio City (104.8 MHz)
Gyan Vani (106.4 MHz)
AIR FM Gold (736 MW)

Ayodhya, Uttar Pradesh 

AIR Ayodhya Radio (101.4 MHz)
Awadhi Radio (98.2 MHz)
Big FM (92.7 MHz)
Red FM (93.5 MHz)
Fever 104 FM (95.0 MHz)
Radio Ayodhya (102.9 MHz)
Vividh Bharati (103.7 MHz)
Awadh University Radio (96.9 MHz)
NAG FM (106.4 MHz)

Jaipur, Rajasthan 

Radio City (91.1 MHz)
Red FM (93.5 MHz)
MY FM (94.3 MHz)
Tadka (95.0 MHz)
Radio Mirchi (98.3 MHz)
Radio Selfie (90.8 MHz)
All India Radio (100.3 MHz)
All India Radio(Jaipur) (101.2 MHz)
Mirchi Love (104.0)

Ahmedabad, Gujarat 

Radio Mirchi - 98.3 FM (Times Group)
My FM - 94.3 FM D B Corp Ltd.
Red FM - 93.5 FM (Sun Group
Radio City - 91.1 FM (Music Broadcast Limited)
 Radio One - 95.0 FM (Only Bollywood Retro Station of Ahmedabad)
AIR Vividh Bharati - 96.7 FM (All India Radio)
Micavaani - 90.4 FM (Mudra Institute of Communications)
AIR Gyan Vaani - 105.4 FM (All India Radio)
Mirchi Love - 104 FM (Times Group)
All India radio - 100.1 FM
Radio Nazariya - 107.8 FM (Drishti)

Hyderabad

Mumbai, Maharashtra

Bansal FM 95.5
Vividh Bharati
Jago Mumbai 90.8
Radio City 91.1 FM
Big FM 92.7
Red FM 93.5
Radio One 94.3 (Only English Radio station of Mumbai)
Radio Mirchi 98.3 FM
Radio Dhamaal 106.4
AIR FM Gold 100.7
RAINBOW FM 102.2
Fever 104 FM 104.0
Oye 104.8 104.8
AIR FM Rainbow 107.1
Mumbai One
Magic FM 106.4
Gyan Vani
Radio MUST
Radio Nasha 91.9

Bengaluru, Karnataka

Radio City 91.1 FM - Kannada
Indigo 91.9 FM FM - (English, Devotional)
Big 92.7 FM - Kannada
Red FM 93.5 FM - Hindi
Radio ONE FM 94.3 - English
Radio Mirchi 95 FM - Hindi
Radio Mirchi 98.3 FM Kannada 
Ragam 100.1 FM (Classical)
FM Rainbow 101.3 FM (Kannada, Hindi, English)
Vividh Bharti 102.9 FM (Kannada, Hindi) 
Fever FM 104 FM (Hindi)
Radio Active  Community Radio 106.4 FM (Kannada, English, Hindi)

Chennai, Tamil Nadu

AIR FM - RAINBOW 101.4 Multilingual
AIR FM - GOLD 102.3 Tamil
Chennai Live 104.8 FM ENGLISH
Hello FM (106.4), Tamil
Suryan FM 93.5, Tamil
Fever FM 91.9, Tamil
BIG FM 92.7,Tamil
Radio City FM 91.1, Tamil
Radio Mirchi FM 98.3, Tamil
Radio one 94.3, Tamil
Anna FM 90.4 Tamil

Kerala state

Radio Mattoli FM 90.4, Wayanad
Radio DC FM 90.4, Thiruvananthapuram
Radio Macfast FM 90.4, Thiruvalla
AIR Real FM 103.6 in Kozhikode
Best FM 95.00 in Thrissur & Kannur
Radio Mango 91.9, in Kochi, Thrissur, Kozhikode & Kannur & 92.7 in Alappuzha
Red FM 93.5 in Thiruvananthapuram, Kochi, Kozhikode & Kannur 
 Red FM 91.1 in Thrissur
Club FM 94.3 in Thiruvananthapuram, Kochi & Kannur ;
Club FM 104.8 Alappuzha
 Club FM 104.8 in Thrissur & Kozhikode
Radio Mirchi 98.3 in Thiruvananthapuram,
BIG FM 92.7 in Thiruvananthapuram
AIR FM Rainbow 107.5 in Kochi
AIR Ananthapuri FM 101.9 in Thiruvananthapuram,
AIR Thiruvananthapuram 106.5
AIR Thrissur 101.1
AIR Kochi FM 102.3
AIR Kannur 101.5
AIR Devikulam 101.4
AIR Manjeri FM 102.7
AIR Gyan Vani-Kochi 106.5
Radio Media Village Changanacherry FM 90.8
Global Radio 91.2 FM Alappuzha
Radio Mirchi 104 Kochi
Radio Neythal 90.8 FM Alappuzha

Market view 
Traditionally, radio accounts for 7% to 8% of advertiser expenditures around the world. In India, it is less than 2% at present.

The ministry of broadcasting in India is setting up more (86) FM Radio to all parts of India by March 2017.

List of FM Stations in Jaipur:

 91.1 Radio City (Listenership; 2.8 lacs plus)
 98.3 Radio Mirchi (Listenership; 10 lacs plus)
 93.5 Red FM (Listenership; 9.5 lacs plus)
 95 Tadka (Listenership; 4.3 lacs plus)
 94.3 MY FM (Listenership; 18 lacs plus)

Current allocation process 
In FM Phase II — the latest round of the long-delayed opening up of private FM in India — some 338 frequencies were offered of which about 237 were sold.

References 

Lists of radio stations in India